The Microsoft Theater (formerly Nokia Theatre L.A. Live) is a music and theater venue in downtown Los Angeles, California, at L.A. Live. The theater auditorium seats 7,100 and holds one of the largest indoor stages in the United States.

History
The theatre was designed by ELS Architecture and Urban Design of Berkeley, California on a commission by the Anschutz Entertainment Group (AEG) in 2002. It opened on October 18, 2007 with six concerts featuring The Eagles and The Dixie Chicks. On June 7, 2015, the Nokia Theatre was re-branded as Microsoft Theater as part of a new naming rights deal with AEG Live following Microsoft's acquisition of Nokia's mobile device business in 2014. As part of the new naming rights deal, the L.A. Live plaza was also renamed Microsoft Square (now Xbox Plaza), and Microsoft provided upgrades to the venue's technology.

Awards shows

Since its opening in 2007, the Microsoft Theater has become the venue of multiple entertainment industry awards shows, most notably the Primetime Emmy Awards.

Primetime Emmy Awards
Since 2008, the Microsoft Theater has been the venue of the annual Primetime Emmy Awards ceremony after that show moved here from the Shrine Auditorium, except 2020 due to the COVID-19 pandemic, when it was held at the Crypto.com Arena. The Primetime Creative Arts Emmy Awards, which take place a week before the Primetime Emmy Awards, are also held at the Microsoft Theater. Following the Emmy Awards telecast, the Governors Ball is held across the street at the Los Angeles Convention Center. The Emmys will continue to be held at the Microsoft Theater through 2022 and possibly 2026.

Grammy Awards
In 2008 and 2011, the venue hosted The Grammy Nominations Live, a concert announcing the nominees for the Grammy Awards. The Grammy Awards take place annually across the street at the Crypto.com Arena, but the Premier Ceremony (also referred to as the "pre-telecast" ceremony) is held at the Microsoft Theater. Approximately 70 Grammy categories are awarded at the Premier ceremony which takes place prior to the main telecast which is televised, is held at the Microsoft Theater.

American Music Awards
Since 2007, the annual American Music Awards have been held here after moving from the Shrine Auditorium.

ESPY Awards
Since 2008, the ESPY Awards, honoring outstanding athletic achievement, have been held at this venue.

The Game Awards
From 2015-present (excluding 2020), the Microsoft Theater has hosted The Game Awards, presented by Geoff Keighley.

People's Choice Awards
The venue has also hosted the annual People's Choice Awards from 2010 to 2017.

BET Awards
The annual BET Awards have been held at the venue from 2013 to 2019, and 2021.

MTV Video Music Awards
The Microsoft Theater hosted the MTV Video Music Awards in 2010, 2011, and 2015.

Radio Disney Music Awards
The venue has hosted the Radio Disney Music Awards from 2013 to 2017.

MTV Movie Awards
The Microsoft Theater hosted the MTV Movie Awards in 2014 and 2015.

iHeartRadio Music Awards
The Microsoft Theater hosted the iHeartRadio Music Awards in 2019.

Billboard Music Awards
The Microsoft Theater hosted the Billboard Music Awards in 2021.

Nickelodeon Kids' Choice Awards
The Microsoft Theater hosted the Nickelodeon Kids' Choice Awards in 2023.

Sports
The Microsoft Theater has also served as a sports venue. It has hosted boxing matches and will also serve as a venue during the 2028 Olympics.

Boxing
The venue has hosted professional boxing matches for circuits such as Golden Boy Promotions and Premier Boxing Champions.

2028 Summer Olympics
The Microsoft Theater is set to host weightlifting at the 2028 Summer Olympics. However, weightlifting might not be included at the games as the sport risks being dropped from the Olympic program by the IOC.

Other events
The theater has also been used by Microsoft and Nintendo multiple times for press conferences during E3.

John Mayer played a concert at the theater on December 8, 2007 for the first revue of his Annual John Mayer Holiday Charity Revue, consisting of three separate performances: the first an acoustic set opened by Mayer and joined by the guitarists from his band, the second with the John Mayer Trio, and the third with Mayer's regular touring band. This was recorded and released as the live album/concert film Where the Light Is.

It was also the venue for the finale of American Idol from 2008 to 2014.

Vocaloid character Hatsune Miku made her U.S. debut at the Microsoft Theater on July 2, 2011, as part of Anime Expo. She returned to the venue on October 11–12, 2014 as part of Miku Expo LA 2014. Both concerts were sold out. Hatsune Miku returned for another performance on May 6, 2016, as part of her first North American tour. She once again returned to the Microsoft Theater as part of her second tour of North America on June 29, 2018.

The popular children's musical show Yo Gabba Gabba! held their brand-new concert called: Yo Gabba Gabba! LIVE! There's a Party in my City! in 2011 which was filmed there.

The 28th Annual Rock and Roll Hall of Fame inductions were held at the Microsoft Theater on April 18, 2013. The ceremony was held at Microsoft Theater again in 2022.

The inauguration ceremony for the 9th Summit of the Americas was held at the theater for world leaders and President Joe Biden in 2022.

On December 11, 2022, Microsoft Theater hosted the inauguration for Mayor Karen Bass.

References

External links

 

Music venues in Los Angeles
Concert halls in California
Theatres in Los Angeles
Buildings and structures in Downtown Los Angeles
L.A. Live
South Park (Downtown Los Angeles)
Microsoft advertising campaigns
Boxing venues in Los Angeles
Mixed martial arts venues in California
Music venues completed in 2007
Theatres completed in 2007
2000s architecture in the United States
2007 establishments in California
2007 in American music
Venues of the 2028 Summer Olympics
Olympic weightlifting venues